Purnima (also Poornima or Pournima), meaning "full moon" in Sanskrit.

Purnima may also refer to:

Persons with the given name
 Purnima (Hindi actress) (1934–2013), Indian actress
 Poornima (Telugu actress), Indian actress mid 1980s
 Poornima (singer) (1960), Bollywood playback singer
 Purnima (Bangladeshi actress) (1981), Bangladeshi actress
 Purnima Banerjee (1911–1951), Indian freedom activist
 Poornima Bhagyaraj (born 1960), Indian film actress
 Purnima Choudhary (born 1971), Indian cricketer
 Purnima Devi (1884–1972), Indian educator
 Poornima Indrajith, Indian actress and television presenter
 Purnima Mahato, Indian archer and archery coach
 Poornima Arvind Pakvasa (1913–2016), Indian social worker
 Purnima Rau (born 1967), Indian cricketer
 Purnima Mane, Indian author and global health expert
 Purnima Shrestha, Nepalese mountaineer and photojournalist

Other uses
 Purnima (film), a 1965 Hindi film starring Dharmendra, Meena Kumari and Mehmood